XHTGZ-FM is a radio station on 96.1 FM in Tuxtla Gutiérrez, Chiapas, Mexico. It is owned by Radio Núcleo and carries the Los 40 pop format from Radiópolis.

History
XHTGZ received its concession on December 15, 1986. It was owned by Amin Simán Habib. In 2005, Siman Habib transferred the station to a corporation held by members of the Siman Estefan family.

References

Radio stations in Chiapas
Radio stations established in 1986
1986 establishments in Mexico